The 2011–12 season was the 120th season in Liverpool Football Club's existence, and their 50th consecutive year in the top flight of English football, but they were not participating in any UEFA competition for the first time since the 1999-2000 season.

Liverpool had mixed fortunes during the season; they enjoyed success in the domestic cups, winning the League Cup for a record eighth time – also their first trophy since 2006 – and reached the FA Cup Final, where they lost to Chelsea. By virtue of winning the League Cup, Liverpool qualified for the 2012–13 UEFA Europa League. The club's league form, however, was indifferent and they finished eighth, their joint-lowest Premier League finish since finishing eighth in 1994, resulting in Kenny Dalglish being relieved of his duties on 16 May 2012.

Season review

Pre-season
Liverpool began their pre-season schedule with a fixture against Guangdong Sunray Cave on 13 July as part of their tour of China, with Liverpool narrowly winning 4–3. Christian Poulsen scored his first Reds' goal, David N'Gog and Andy Carroll grabbed one each and 18-year-old debutant Conor Coady also got a goal, with the new signing Charlie Adam featuring for 45 minutes. On 16 July 2011, they continued their tour of Asia when they played the Malaysia All-Stars XI team. They won the game 6–3 despite a number of defensive errors. Charlie Adam scored his first goal from the penalty spot, Maxi Rodríguez and David N'Gog both got braces and Dirk Kuyt also scored to round off the victory. On 23 July, they travelled to the KC Stadium to play Hull City where they lost 3–0. The game saw other summer recruits Jordan Henderson, Stewart Downing and Doni make their debuts. They later played against Galatasaray in Istanbul on 28 July and lost 3–0 again. Next, they played Vålerenga away on 1 August and drew the game 3–3. Daniel Agger hit a brace and Andy Carroll scored the other. They played their final pre-season game on 6 August at Anfield against Valencia, winning 2–0. Andy Carroll and Dirk Kuyt were on the scoresheet, although the latter's shot appeared to take a deflection off Sotiris Kyrgiakos before rolling into the net.

August
Liverpool started their Premier League campaign on 13 August, at home to Sunderland. The match finished 1–1, the Liverpool goal coming in the 12th minute from Luis Suárez from a Charlie Adam free kick. Suárez had missed an early penalty which he had won after being brought down by Kieran Richardson, firing the ball over the bar from the spot.
Andy Carroll had a goal ruled out before Sunderland equalised in the 57th minute with a volley from Sebastian Larsson.
Jordan Henderson made his full Liverpool debut against his former club, with Charlie Adam, Stewart Downing and José Enrique also making their debuts, despite the latter signing just the day before.

Liverpool played their second league match against Arsenal on 20 August at the Emirates Stadium. Liverpool won the match 2–0, taking advantage of Arsenal's worries on and off the pitch. The first half saw Henderson and Carroll go close for Liverpool with headers, with Pepe Reina not even troubled by the hosts. In the second half, Arsenal midfielder Emmanuel Frimpong received a second yellow card after a dangerous tackle on Lucas. The visitors' first goal came in the 78th minute after Arsenal's young centre-back Ignasi Miquel's attempted to clear the ball, only for it to strike Aaron Ramsey in the chest and looped over Wojciech Szczęsny. Substitute Luis Suárez wrapped up the points in the 90th minute, when Raul Meireles squared the ball to him to tuck it under the oncoming Szczęsny. The 2–0 win was Liverpool's first victory at Arsenal since 2000, when a Titi Camara goal won the game for Liverpool.

Liverpool then faced a League Cup tie at Exeter City. Liverpool won 3–1, Suárez scoring in the 23rd minute and unselfishly setting up other two for Maxi Rodríguez on the 55th minute and substitute Andy Carroll on the 58th.

Liverpool faced Bolton Wanderers at Anfield. Liverpool won by the same margin of 3–1 with Henderson and Adam scoring their first goals for the club, Martin Škrtel also scoring with a header from a corner by Adam. This win saw Liverpool as overnight leaders of the Premier League for the first time since 2009.

September
Liverpool suffered their first defeat of the season on 10 September 2011, against Stoke City at the Britannia Stadium. Jonathan Walters scored the only goal of the game by converting a 21st-minute penalty.

Liverpool then traveled to White Hart Lane to play against Tottenham Hotspur. Spurs, by Luka Modrić, took an early lead, and Liverpool had trouble getting into the game. After 28 minutes, Charlie Adam received his second yellow card, and was sent off. After half time Liverpool got more into the game, but after 68 minutes, Martin Škrtel received his second yellow card, and reduced Liverpool to nine players. After two minutes, Spurs had scored two more goals, and in injury time, Emmanuel Adebayor sealed the game 4–0 to Tottenham, Liverpool's worst defeat to Tottenham since 1963.

Liverpool then traveled to Brighton to face Brighton and Hove Albion in the third round encounter of the League Cup. Craig Bellamy and Dirk Kuyt were on target for Liverpool. Ashley Barnes scored an injury time consolation for Brighton. The final score remained 2–1 in Liverpool's favor and they qualified for the fourth round.

Liverpool then hosted Wolverhampton Wanderers and returned to winning ways. They won by 2–1. Roger Johnson's own goal and Luis Suárez's goal gave them a 2–0 lead at halftime before Steven Fletcher scored in the second half to make the score 2–1.

October
Liverpool faced their local rivals Everton at Goodison Park and won 2–0. Jack Rodwell got sent off in the first half. Liverpool made benefit of the numerical advantage and scored twice in the second half through Luis Suárez and Andy Carroll, who scored his first league goal of the season.

Liverpool then hosted Manchester United. Steven Gerrard, who was making his first start after returning from injury, scored from a free kick to give Liverpool the lead before Javier Hernández scored to make the final score 1–1. The game was marred by Luis Suárez racially abusing United's Patrice Evra.

Liverpool then hosted the newcomers Norwich City and drew 1–1. Craig Bellamy scored in the stoppage time of first half. Substitute Grant Holt scored in the second half to make the score 1–1. Liverpool created a lot of opportunities throughout the game but were denied by the Norwich defense and goalkeeper and the match ended in a draw.

Liverpool then faced Stoke at Britannia Stadium in the fourth round of League Cup. Stoke took the lead in the first half thanks to a goal from Kenwyne Jones. Luis Suárez, however, scored two second half goals to give Liverpool the win and they made it to the quarter final of the League Cup. This was Liverpool's first win after going a goal down since January.

Liverpool then faced West Bromwich Albion at The Hawthorns. Charlie Adam scored a ninth-minute penalty to give Liverpool the lead after Suárez was brought down. Andy Carroll scored at the end of first half to make the score 2–0 in Liverpool's favor.

November
After the 2–0 away win at West Brom, Liverpool then had a match at home to Swansea City, which finished a disappointing 0–0 draw. Liverpool once again had several chances but they still couldn't get the ball past Swansea keeper Michel Vorm, who made some world class saves.

After the international break, Liverpool had another league match away to Chelsea at Stamford Bridge, the game finished 2–1 to Liverpool for their third consecutive win over the Londoners. Neat play from Craig Bellamy and Luis Suárez set up the first goal for Maxi Rodríguez to give the Reds a 1–0 lead before the interval. Ten minutes after half-time Daniel Sturridge leveled for Chelsea for 1–1 until late on in the 87th minute full-back Glen Johnson had a great run at goal and netted the winner to make it 2–1.

Liverpool then faced against league leaders Manchester City at Anfield. A header from City defender Vincent Kompany gave City a 1–0 lead, but then the celebrations were short-lived as Charlie Adam's strike going wide was touched into his own net by Joleon Lescott for an own goal. There were no other goals in the second half but City substitute Mario Balotelli was sent off for a second yellow about 15 minutes after coming off the bench. Liverpool had a couple of chances against 10-men City but no chances were taken and the game finished 1–1.

Only two days after the Manchester City, Liverpool had a League Cup quarter-final tie against Chelsea. This time both, of the former Liverpool players, Raul Meireles and Fernando Torres, started whereas last time they both came off the bench. There were no goals in the first half but in the 58th minute, Maxi Rodríguez broke the deadlock from close range from Craig Bellamy's pass for 1–0. 5 minutes later Martin Kelly headed in to make it 2–0 with his first goal for Liverpool. But this victory resulted in a serious injury by Lucas, who ruptured his anterior cruciate ligament (ACL) after colliding with Juan Mata, and he was ruled out for the rest of the season.

December
Liverpool's first game in December was an away match to Fulham at Craven Cottage which the Reds won 5–2 seven months ago. Liverpool pushed in the first half with Jordan Henderson hitting the post, but nothing came off and it was 0–0 at the interval. In the second half Liverpool went down to 10-men due to a controversial sending off for Jay Spearing for a challenge on Moussa Dembélé. Fulham made them pay as Clint Dempsey scored from close range off of a rebound in the 85th minute to win it for Fulham.

The Reds next had another league game against Queens Park Rangers at Anfield, which Liverpool won courtesy of a Luis Suárez header in the early stages of the second half. This win ended a run of four poor draws at home since they won 3–1 against Bolton.

Their next league game was against Aston Villa at Villa Park. The Reds won 2–0 with goals from Craig Bellamy and Martin Škrtel.

Liverpool's next fixture was an away tie against 18th-placed Wigan Athletic at the DW Stadium. The game ended as a goalless draw.

The next match was against Blackburn Rovers at home. Blackburn took an early courtesy of a Charlie Adam own goal during the end of the first half from a corner. Liverpool equalised with a Maxi Rodríguez header early in the second half. Liverpool put tremendous pressure on Blackburn's defence in the dying moments of the game, but were unlucky not to get three points thanks to some resolute defending by the away side. The game ended 1–1.

Just a few days later Liverpool played their last league game of 2011; a home tie against Newcastle United. Needing a win to keep up with their pursuit of a Champions League spot, Liverpool started the game off by going a goal down against the run of play; an unfortunate Daniel Agger deflection putting Newcastle in the lead in the 25th minute. The Reds responded almost instantly when Craig Bellamy pounced on a loose ball in the box three minutes later to equalise. In the second half, the Reds dominated play. Bellamy scored his second from a fantastic free kick, and returning captain Steven Gerrard completed the scoring with a fine finish in the 78th minute.

January
Liverpool's first game of 2012 involved a daunting trip to league leaders Manchester City. This was also the first of three games against the league leaders scheduled for January. The hosts had not lost a single game at their home ground in the Premier League all season. Liverpool started brightly but were unfortunate to go a goal down thanks to a Sergio Agüero strike early in the first half. The Reds eventually lost the game 3–0 after some fine Manchester City finishing. Their second game of the year was an FA Cup third Round tie against Oldham Athletic at Anfield. Liverpool eased past the opposition by winning 5–1. Stewart Downing and Jonjo Shelvey were amongst the goalscorers for the Reds, netting their first ever competitive goals for the club. On 11 January 2012 saw Liverpool face Manchester City for the second time in an away League Cup semi-final; the first of two legs to be played this month. After a convincing defeat the previous week at the same ground, Liverpool produced a fantastic defensive display after captain Gerrard had put them in front in the 13th minute from the penalty spot. They ran out 1–0 victors and condemning Manchester City to their second defeat in their last two games, as well as their first home game without scoring a goal.

On 14 January 2012, Liverpool drew 0–0 at home to Stoke City, followed one week later by a 3–1 away loss to Bolton, which manager Kenny Dalglish branded Liverpool's worst performance since his return. With this in mind, it created added pressure for the return leg of the League Cup semi-final against Manchester City. Liverpool had a number of chances to score, but excellent goalkeeping by Joe Hart kept them out and they fell behind twice. Their efforts eventually came to fruition, however, with the game ending as a 2–2 draw, with Liverpool winning 3–2 on aggregate and reaching Wembley for the first time since 1996 and the new Wembley for the first time. On 28 January 2012, Liverpool faced Manchester United in the FA Cup Fourth Round at home. Liverpool started the scoring with Daniel Agger early on in the first half. Park Ji-sung netted one to create the equalizer. Substitute Dirk Kuyt netted a final one, defeating Manchester United. Next, the Reds faced Wolverhampton Wanderers away. Andy Caroll, Craig Bellamy and Dirk Kuyt were on target, ending the match 3–0.

February
The beginning of February saw the return to action of Luis Suárez following his eight-match ban. Due to their involvement in both domestic cups, Liverpool played only two league games in the month of February, a 0–0 draw against Tottenham, and a 2–1 loss away at Manchester United, where Suárez scored late on to provide a consolation goal. Liverpool went on to face Brighton & Hove Albion at Anfield in the fifth round of the FA Cup, a game they won 6–1 thanks to goals from Luis Suárez, Andy Carroll, Steven Gerrard, Martin Škrtel, and two Brighton own-goals. This saw them through to the sixth round, where they were drawn against Stoke City. Liverpool's last game of the month was the 2012 Football League Cup Final against Cardiff City at Wembley, held on 26 February 2012. The game finished 1–1 after 90 minutes, and 2–2 after extra time, with Liverpool prevailing 3–2 in the subsequent penalty shoot-out. This won Liverpool the Football League Cup for a record eighth time in their history, as well as ending a run of six years without a trophy.

March
Following victory in the League Cup, many predicted that Liverpool would be able to produce momentum that would take them towards Champions League qualification. Their league campaign began to falter however, with a first home defeat of the season to Arsenal after a last minute Robin van Persie goal gave them a 2–1 victory, followed by a scrappy 1–0 loss away at Sunderland. Three days later, Liverpool faced Everton in the second Merseyside derby of the season, this time at Anfield. The game also marked the 400th league appearance of Steven Gerrard for Liverpool, and he scored a hat-trick to give Liverpool a 3–0 victory. Liverpool would go on to secure a place in the FA Cup semi-final by defeating Stoke City 2–1 at Anfield, with strikes from Luis Suárez and Stewart Downing. Despite these successes, Liverpool were unable to revive their faltering league campaign, seeing a 2–0 lead turn into a 3–2 defeat at Loftus Road to QPR and losing 2–1 at Anfield to Wigan, both of whom were teams fighting relegation. This gave Liverpool a league record of five defeats in six games.

April
Liverpool began April with a 2–0 loss away at Newcastle, marked their sixth defeat in seven league games, officially their worst run of league results in 59 years. This saw pressure begin to mount on manager Kenny Dalglish, as Champions League qualification had become all but impossible for Liverpool for a third successive season. The defeat also saw Liverpool's first-choice keeper Pepe Reina – also the only player to start every game under Dalglish and played every minute of all competitive matches this season – receive a three-match ban after being sent off. This gave Doni his first competitive appearance for Liverpool, in a game the following week at Anfield against Aston Villa, which ended in a 1–1 draw. The following week Liverpool faced Blackburn away, in a remarkable game which saw Liverpool go 2–0 up through two goals from Maxi Rodríguez, only for Doni to be sent off for a foul in the penalty box, requiring Liverpool's third-choice keeper Brad Jones to replace him, and also become Liverpool's only goalkeeper for the FA Cup semi-final. Jones' first contribution for Liverpool was to save the penalty given by the foul. Blackburn then hit back twice through Yakubu, before Andy Carroll headed a winner in added time, securing Liverpool's first win in the league for almost a month.

Four days later, Liverpool faced Everton at Wembley in the FA Cup semi-final. Liverpool went into the semi-final trailing Everton in the league by one point, with many tipping Everton to beat Liverpool in a major semi-final for the first time in over a century. Nikica Jelavić gave Everton a 1–0 lead in the first half, with Luis Suárez equalising in the second half. The game looked to be heading towards extra time before Andy Carroll scored a second headed winner in as many games in the 87th minute, sending Liverpool through to their first FA Cup Final since 2006 – where they defeated West Ham United – and also their second cup final of the season. They will face Chelsea in the Final at Wembley on 5 May 2012. If they win this year's FA Cup Final, they will enter the group stage of 2012–13 UEFA Europa League directly without the need to enter the 2012–13 UEFA Europa League Qualifying Rounds. However, the last-gasp win over their local rivals was not enough to see renewed momentum in the league campaign however, as despite firing 30 shots on goal, Liverpool lost 1–0 at home to West Brom on 22 April. They ended the month with a win however, after Luis Suárez scored his first Liverpool hat-trick to seal a 3–0 win away at Norwich on 29 April.

May
Liverpool began May with a 1–0 defeat at home to Fulham, giving the Reds their fourth defeat in five games at Anfield. On 5 May 2012, they were defeated by Chelsea 2–1 in the 2012 FA Cup Final. Three days later the two teams faced each other for a Premier League meeting. Liverpool went out strong in the first half recording three goals in the first 30 minutes of the match. The first goal was a sensational run down the line from Luis Suárez and he crossed it in where then Michael Essien would score an own goal. Soon after, a ball played back from Ivanović to John Terry faulted as Terry fell and Jordan Henderson ran onto it and scored it with his dominate foot with a great finish. Four minutes later a far post corner from central midfielder Jonjo Shelvey was headed by Andy Carroll to Daniel Agger and resulted in a 3–0 lead over Chelsea after the first half. Within the second half Chelsea scored off of a Florent Malouda set piece outside the 18-yard box and chested in from Brazilian international Ramires. Later in the second half, Ross Turnbull kicked it to clear it and bluffed it and Jonjo Shelvey trapped it and made a sensational finish to secure a final 4–1 win for Liverpool. In the final game of the season, Liverpool faced an away trip to Swansea and suffered a 1–0 defeat.

Transfers

Transfers in
First Team

Reserves and Academy

Transfers out
First team

Reserves and Academy

Loans out
{|class="wikitable" style="text-align:center; font-size:95%; text-align:left"
|-
!#
!Pos
!Nat.
!Player
!To
!Start
!End
!Source
|-
| 32
| RB
| 
| Stephen Darby
|  Rochdale
| 7 July 2011
| 30 June 2012
|
|-
| 42
| GK
| 
| Péter Gulácsi
|  Hull City
| 19 July 2011
| 13 April 2012†
|
|-
|41
| GK
| 
| Martin Hansen
|  Bradford City
| 28 July 2011
| 28 August 2011
|
|-
| 12
| AM
| 
| Dani Pacheco
|  Atlético Madrid
| 24 August 2011
| 30 June 2012
|
|-
| 15
| CM
| 
| Alberto Aquilani
|  Milan
| 25 August 2011
| 30 June 2012
|
|-
| 10
| RW
| 
| Joe Cole
|  Lille
| 31 August 2011
| 30 June 2012
|
|-
|
| FW
| 
| Villyan Bijev
|  Fortuna Düsseldorf
| 31 August 2011
|
|
|-
|
| RW
| 
| David Amoo
|  Bury
| 23 September 2011
| 22 October 2011
|
|-
| 33
| MF
| 
| Jonjo Shelvey
|  Blackpool
| 30 September 2011
| 30 November 2011†
| (Recall)
|-
|
| FW
| 
| Nathan Eccleston
|  Rochdale
| 20 October 2011
| 20 November 2011
|
|-
|
| MF
| 
| Toni Silva
|  Northampton Town
| 14 February 2011
| 30 June 2012
|
|-
|
| RW
| 
| David Amoo
|  Bury
| 20 October 2011
| 2 January 2012
|
|-
| 22
| CB
| 
| Danny Wilson
|  Blackpool
| 31 December 2011
| 30 June 2012
|

†Loan ended prematurely

Players

First team

Players' age as of 31 December 2011 (mid-season)

Notes
 Fábio Aurélio, Lucas, and Maxi Rodríguez also hold Italian citizenship.

Competitions

Overall

Pre-season matches

Premier League

League table

Results summary

Results by round

Matches

Football League Cup

FA Cup

Other

Friendly

Squad statistics

Appearances and goals

Top scorers
Includes all competitive matches. The list is sorted by shirt number when total goals are equal.

Last updated on 8 May 2012.

Assists
Includes all competitive matches. The list is sorted by shirt number when total assists are equal.

Last updated on 8 May 2012.

** Players who no longer play for Liverpool's current season

Disciplinary record
Includes all competitive matches. The list is sorted by shirt number when total bookings are equal.

Last updated on 8 May 2012.

References

External links
2011–12 Liverpool F.C. season at Official Site
2011–12 Liverpool F.C. season at ESPN
2011–12 Liverpool F.C. season at LFCHistory

2011–12
2011–12 Premier League by team